Lac à la Dame is a lake at Foncine-le-Bas in the Jura department of France.

The lake is also known as Lac de Foncine-le-Bas or Lac de la Dame.

Lakes of Jura (department)